Timothy J. Heaphy (born 1964) is a white-collar criminal defense attorney, law professor and a former United States Attorney for the Western District of Virginia. He served as the lead investigator for the House Select Committee on the January 6 Attack.

Education and early career
Heaphy was raised in a Maryland suburb of Washington D.C. He attended college at the University of Virginia where he played football. He is married to Lori Shinseki, the daughter of Eric Shinseki.

After graduating from the University of Virginia in 1986, Heaphy taught at a private school for a year and then joined the staff of Senator Joe Biden (D-Del.) He returned to Charlottesville, Virginia in 1988 to attend law school, graduating in 1991.

Heaphy was a law clerk to Judge John A. Terry of the  District of Columbia Court of Appeals before joining the law firm of Morrison & Foerster in San Francisco.

Federal career
Following a two-year stint at Morrison & Foerster, Heaphy joined the U.S. Attorney's Office for the District of Columbia.

In 2003, Heaphy joined the U.S. Attorney’s Office in the Western District of Virginia based in Charlottesville, Virginia.  After three years, Heaphy returned to private practice, serving as a partner with the  law firm of McGuireWoods.  In 2009, Heaphy was nominated by President Barack Obama and became the United States Attorney for the Western District of Virginia on December 11, 2009.

Return to private practice
He left the U.S. Attorney's office in December 2014 to join Hunton & Williams.

In 2016, Heaphy founded a nonprofit organization that will provide low-interest loans to formerly incarcerated persons, The Fountain Fund.

In 2017, Heaphy authored a report, commissioned by the City of Charlottesville, on the city's handling of the August 2017 Unite the Right rally.

Heaphy served as an assistant Virginia attorney general and as counsel for the University of Virginia before taking a leave of absence from both positions in August 2021 after being appointed as chief investigative counsel for the United States House Select Committee on the January 6 Attack.

Awards
In 2003, The National Law Journal named Heaphy one of its 40 Important Lawyers Under 40.

Notes

References
 Movers.  The National Law Journal February 6, 2006
 Jen McCaffrey, Federal Jury Spares Convicted Killer’s Life in Double-Murder Case, The Roanoke Times, February 18, 2005.
 Jim Keary.  "'Slasher' is sentenced; Robber terrorized residents on Hill",  The Washington Times,  December 17, 1997.

External links
 Timothy J. Heaphy, United States Attorney, Office of the United States Attorneys, U.S. Department of Justice

1964 births
Living people
Criminal defense lawyers
Lawyers from New Haven, Connecticut
People associated with Morrison & Foerster
United States Attorneys for the Western District of Virginia
University of Virginia School of Law alumni
Virginia lawyers